Miksa Róth  (26 December 1865 – 14 June 1944) was a Hungarian mosaicist and stained glass artist responsible for making mosaic and stained glass prominent art forms in Hungarian art. In part, Róth was inspired by the work of Pre-Raphaelite artists Edward Burne-Jones and William Morris.

Róth apprenticed at his father, Zsigmond Róth's leaded stained glass studio. Starting a business in 1885, he would make commissions for a number of buildings, largely in Budapest, including the Hungarian Parliament Building and the Buda Castle. Róth also received a number of commissions outside the country as well, for example the National Theatre of Mexico.

References

Further reading 

1865 births
1944 deaths
Mosaic artists
Artists from Budapest
Hungarian Jews